Mastermind is a British television quiz show for the BBC, currently presented by Clive Myrie. Its creator, Bill Wright, drew inspiration from his experiences of being interrogated by the Gestapo during World War II. The show features an intimidating setting and challenging questions. Four (and in later contests five or six) contestants face two rounds, one on a specialised subject of the contestant's choice, the other a general knowledge round.

Masterminds theme music is "Approaching Menace" by the British composer Neil Richardson. The show was recorded, with original presenter Magnus Magnusson, on location at UK universities. Later, it was recorded in Manchester at studios such as New Broadcasting House and Granada Studios, before moving to dock10 studios in 2011. The show relocated to Belfast for the 2019–2020 series.

Format
For the first round, each contestant in turn is given a set length of time, usually two minutes (one minute and a half in semi-finals), to answer questions on a specialised subject which they have chosen. The contestant scores one point for each correct answer and may pass as often as desired. If the contestant responds incorrectly, the questioner gives the correct answer before continuing to the next question; answers to passed questions are read out only after time has expired. In early series, the score and time were kept by Mary Craig who sat next to Magnusson.

If time runs out while a question is being read, the questioner will finish it and give the contestant a few seconds to answer. This has led to the programme's catchphrase, "I've started so I'll finish." If a question has been read out in full when time expires, but the contestants have not yet given an answer, they are allowed a few seconds to do so. The contestant's score is displayed on screen; beginning with the 2016–17 series, the border around the score gradually turns blue (black in the 2019–20 series) during the final 10 seconds.

During the second round, each contestant in turn answers a series of general knowledge questions. The rules from the first round apply, except that the time limit is extended (usually two and a half minutes since 2010, or two minutes in semi-finals and until 2010). Originally, the contestants played in the same order as in the first round; currently, they play in ascending order by first-round score.

The winner is the contestant with the highest total score after two rounds. Ties are broken in favour of the contestant with the fewest total passes. If contestants have the same score and number of passes, a five-question tiebreaker is played. Each of the tied contestants answers the same set of questions individually, with the others exiting the studio so that they cannot hear the results. The contestant who gives the most correct answers is the winner.

The winners advance to the next round, for which they must choose a different specialised subject. In the early years of the programme, finalists were allowed to reuse their first round subjects in the grand final. However, from 1992 onwards, the finalists are required to choose a third subject. The winner of the final of the BBC version is declared "Mastermind" for that year and is the only contestant to receive a prize, in the form of a cut glass engraved bowl. During Magnus Magnusson's tenure as presenter, the trophy was specially manufactured by Caithness Glass. A special guest would always be invited to present the trophy to the winner, with the exception of the final edition in 1997, in which Magnusson presented it himself.  Every trophy used by the main series has been made by Scottish artist Denis Mann.

Versions
Mastermind (1972 to 1997) presented by Magnus Magnusson aired on television channel BBC1. It was originally broadcast late on a Sunday night and was not expected to receive a huge audience. In 1973 it was moved to a prime-time slot as an emergency replacement for a Leslie Phillips sitcom, Casanova '73, which had been moved to a later time following complaints about its risqué content. The quiz subsequently became one of the most-watched shows on British television. Magnusson's catchphrase "I've started so I'll finish" was also the title of his history of the show. The original series was filmed in academic or ecclesiastical buildings. The last programme of the original series was filmed at St Magnus Cathedral in Orkney.

The original series spawned many specials:
 Supermind was an annual playoff between either the first four champions of Mastermind or champions of other TV quiz shows (including Mastermind) from 1976 or 1977. It ran for three years between 1976 and 1978. 
 Cup Final Mastermind was an annual playoff between experts and supporters from the FA Cup Finalist teams they are supporting. It ran from 1978 and 1980. 
 Mastermind International was an annual playoff between winners of various international versions of the show (or the nearest equivalents in some countries) and ran for five years between 1979 and 1983. 
 Mastermind Champions was a 1982 3-part competition where the first ten champions of the show compete to become the Mastermind Champion of Champions.

BBC Radio 4's Mastermind (1998 and 2000) was hosted by Peter Snow.

Discovery Channel's Mastermind (2001) was hosted by Clive Anderson. The commercials shortened the amount of time available for answering questions and lasted just one series. This was also the first to go 'interactive'. By using the red button viewers could play the general knowledge section throughout the series. These questions had been written specifically to afford both standard and multiple-choice format in presentation. There was a one-off competition between the four highest scoring viewers.

In 2003, the current BBC Two version premiered, hosted by John Humphrys. Whereas the original series had kept talk to a minimum (asking contestants only their name, occupation and specialist subject), the new run had at first included some conversational elements with contestants, at the start of the General Knowledge round (normally about the contestant's specialist subject). But these have been dropped since the 2011 series. Instead there is now a brief monologue from the winner at the end of each episode about how pleased they are to have won. There is no discussion with the other contestants. It is also distinguished from the original BBC TV series because many more of the specialist subjects come from popular culture. This probably reflects cultural changes in the British middle classes in recent years. Unlike the original version, this version is studio-based. It is now made in MediaCity in Salford. However, due to asbestos being found at Granada's Manchester studios parts of the 2006 series were filmed at Yorkshire Television's Leeds studios). 
 In 2008 there was a 10-part competition this time entitled Sport Mastermind, hosted by Des Lynam. 
 Mastermind Champion of Champions was a 2010 5-part competition that featured previous Mastermind champions. 
 Junior Mastermind, also hosted by John Humphrys, is a children's version of the quiz programme and has the same format, the difference being that the contestants are only ten and eleven years old. The programme aired across six nights on BBC One, ending on 4 September 2004. The winner was Daniel Parker, whose specialist subjects were the Volkswagen Beetle (heat) and James Bond villains (final).  There was another series in 2005 (subjects included Black Holes and the Star Wars trilogy), which was won by Robin Geddes, whose specialist subjects were The Vicar of Dibley and A Series of Unfortunate Events, with a third series airing in 2006, won by Domnhall Ryan, and featuring subjects such as Harry Potter and Chelsea Football Club, and a fourth series in 2007 won by Robert Stutter and a fifth series later that year won by David Verghese. The Junior version was cancelled after the two 2007 series.
In February 2021, Humphrys announced that after 18 years at the helm of the show, he would leave the show. On 22 March 2021, it was announced that Clive Myrie would take over as host. Myrie made his debut on 23 August 2021.

In the United States, the game show 2 Minute Drill on sports network ESPN had its roots in Mastermind. Contestants faced questions fired at them by a panel of four sports and entertainment celebrities for two minutes; like Mastermind, there were two rounds of questions, but the first round had each panellist's questions representing a different sports category pertaining to their area of expertise, and the second round had no categories and the contestant could not control who asked the questions; they were fired at random. The contestant with the highest score after two rounds would win a cash prize, and would have a chance to double those winnings by correctly answering the untimed "Question of Great Significance," as host Kenny Mayne called it, from a speciality category chosen by the winner (usually a particular athlete or sports team from the past). In each series, winners advanced in a bracket-style playoff format, with cash prizes increasing from $5,000 in the first round to $50,000 (doubling to $10,000–$100,000 by answering the final question) in the final round. Prizes such as trips to the Super Bowl or ESPY Awards were also given, known as "ESPN Experiences". The show had three series over a 15-month period, from September 2000 to December 2001. Like Mastermind, 2 Minute Drill featured a leather chair, dramatic lighting and sound effects. Willy Gibson of Columbus, Ohio, was the grand champion of the first two series; he was defeated in the second round of the third and final series.

Records

Highest scores
The highest overall Mastermind score is 41 points, set by Kevin Ashman in 1995, his specialist subject being "The Life of Martin Luther King Jr." Ashman went on to become six times IQA world champion. In addition he holds the record for the highest ever score on Brain of Britain and has been a member of the Eggheads since that series debut.

In August 2010 during an edition of Mastermind Champion of Champions, the 2010 series champion, Jesse Honey, scored 23 out of 23 on "Flags of the World" in the specialist subject round, an all-time record. He finished as runner-up with a combined score of 36 points, losing out to Pat Gibson by having two more passes. Honey's score was equalled by Iwan Thomas, who scored a record 23 (in two-and-a-half minutes) in the general knowledge round in 2010.

On Junior Mastermind in February 2007, an 11-year-old schoolboy called Callum scored 19 points on his specialist subject, cricketer Andrew Flintoff. However, he did not win, being beaten by one point after achieving a final score of 32.

Lowest scores
The current record for the lowest score in the specialist subject round is jointly held by Simon Curtis, Steve Ferry, Nancy Lam and Amy Tapper, all of whom only scored 1 point when answering questions on the life and films of Jim Carrey, the Thirty Years' War, Rod Stewart and the films of Adam Sandler respectively.

The current record for the overall lowest score is 2 points, set on 5 November 2022 in a Celebrity edition by Gogglebox’s Amy Tapper, scoring 2 points overall, 1 on her specialist subject of the films of Adam Sandler and another in the general knowledge round.

However, parasport athlete Kadeena Cox - who scored 3 points on 21 December 2016 in a Celebrity edition - scored all 3 points on her specialist subject of Arsenal F.C and she is currently the only ever contestant to score no points in a round.

Prior to these, the record for the overall lowest score was 5 points, set on 29 January 2010 by software analyst Kajen Thuraaisingham, scoring 4 points for his specialist subject of the life of Mustafa Kemal Atatürk. Previous to this, the lowest attained score had been 7 points which was first set by Colin Kidd in 2005. His specialist subject was "The World Chess Championships". The score was equalled in November 2009 by gas fitter Michael Burton; he only scored 2 for his specialist subject, Angels.

Champions

Regular

Supermind

Cup Final/Sport

International

Champions/Champion of Champions
Mastermind Champion of Champions was televised Monday to Friday at 7:30 pm on BBC Two in the first full week of August 2010. It featured the winners of previous series of Mastermind.

Junior

Chair
Contestants sit in a black leather chair, lit by a solitary spotlight in an otherwise dark studio. The inspiration for this was the interrogations faced by the show's creator, Bill Wright, as a prisoner of war in World War II. The original black chair was given to Magnus Magnusson as a souvenir when he retired from the show, and is now owned by his daughter Sally Magnusson who inherited it following her father's death in 2007.  On one occasion the original black chair was stolen by a group of students during the BBC crew's evening meal break, and held to ransom to raise money for charity. This prank delayed the recording of two programmes. The BBC subsequently commissioned a duplicate chair which was kept locked in the scenery truck at every recording to thwart similar ransom demands. The duplicate chair was never used on air, except in the title sequence, which was recorded in London while the main chair was on the road. Its current whereabouts are unknown.

The current chair is an Eames Soft Pad Lounge Chair designed by Charles and Ray Eames in 1969.

Parodies
The programme has been the target for many television spoofs, including a Two Ronnies sketch written by David Renwick (a less polished version had previously appeared in the Radio 4 series "The Burkiss Way") in 1980, featuring Ronnie Barker as Magnus Magnusson and Ronnie Corbett as a contestant named Charlie Smithers, whose specialist subject was "answering the question before last". A different sketch featured Monty Python alumni Michael Palin as Magnusson and Terry Gilliam as a contestant whose speciality was "questions to which the answer is two."

In 1974, Morecambe and Wise performed a sketch based on Mastermind, which featured Magnusson and the black chair.  The format was different, however, with Wise, then Morecambe, being asked 10 questions each.

In 1975 The Goodies featured Mastermind in the episode "Frankenfido" when a dog (Bill Oddie in a suit) appeared on the show and managed to correctly answer questions asked of it as they all had answers that could be represented by growls, such as 'bark' and 'ruff'.

In the late 1970s, Noel Edmonds' radio Sunday lunchtime show featured a send-up called "Musty Mind" where a phone-in contestant would be asked ludicrous questions on a parody of a serious subject, such as the "Toad Racing" or, on another occasion, "The Cultural and Social History of Rockall" – Rockall being a bald lump of uninhabited rock in the eastern Atlantic.

The 2003-onwards version has been spoofed by the Dead Ringers team, with Jon Culshaw playing John Humphrys. In one send-up, which appeared on the television edition of Dead Ringers, the contestant offered to answer questions on Mary Queen of Scots, but when an answer was given, John Humphrys was shown saying "Yes, but you sexed that answer up". The sketch was a reference to the controversy caused by the aftermath of the Iraq War. One episode included Mastermind: The Opera.

Another spoof was featured in Armando Iannucci's 2004: The Stupid Version, where a contestant's specialist subject was "The television series Thunderbirds and Lady Penelope's Cockney chauffeur".

Also in 2004, Johnny Vaughan's BBC Three show Live at Johnny's featured a version called Mastermind Rejects—the premise being that the specialist subjects were too ludicrously obscure even for Mastermind. In the final show of the series, Magnus Magnusson took over as the quizmaster—it was the last time he would utter the catchphrase "I've started so I'll finish" on any form of Mastermind. The specialist subject was The History of the Home Video Recorder, 1972 to 1984.

On their 2005 Christmas Special, comedy duo French & Saunders parodied the show with Jennifer Saunders playing Abigail Wilson, a pensioner whose special subject is ceramic teapots. She passes on all but one question, which she answers incorrectly.

In 2005, the show was spoofed on BBC Radio 4's The Now Show where the specialist subject was "Britishness", relating to the proposed test immigrants may have to take, to prove they can fit in with British society.

Benny Hill parodied Mastermind on The Benny Hill Show on at least two occasions. In one of the parodies the show was called "Masterbrane". In each, Benny played the role of Magnusson while Jackie Wright played the hapless contestant.

Spitting Image used the Mastermind format in a sketch where a Magnus Magnusson puppet asked questions of a Jeffrey Archer puppet whose specialist subject was himself. The twist was that Archer's puppet, being incapable of answering questions about himself without exaggeration or evasion, ends the round with zero points.

The BBC's satirical current affairs quiz show Have I Got News for You has parodied the show several times, by turning the lights down – except for spotlights above select chairs – and playing the theme tune, before subjecting at least one of the panel to some rigorous questioning. The first occasion was on the 1995 video special, when only regular captains Ian Hislop and Paul Merton were asked questions; Hislop on "The Life and Lies of Jeffrey Archer", and Merton on "Absurd Newspaper Stories Between 1990 and 1995". The second occasion was in 1998, when Magnus Magnusson appeared as a guest. All four panellists were asked questions on this occasion.

In his early routines Bill Bailey would often parody the Mastermind music, finding it very sinister. He would then play the music on keyboard with an over-the-top hellish sounding climax. In the last episode of "Is It Bill Bailey?" he followed on from this performance with a sketch where he was a contestant on Mastermind, and it was implied that his specialist subject was the microwave cooking instructions on supermarket ready meals. As the camera panned out it became evident that the chair itself was on a platter, slowly turning in a giant microwave oven.

The Channel 4 Prank programme Balls of Steel parodied Mastermind with its sketch The Alex Zane Cleverness Game, in which experts were quizzed on their specialist subjects (included were "The Life of Anne Frank", "Eurovision Song Contest Winners", and "Hercule Poirot"). Unbeknown to the experts, the show was a hoax, and incorrect answers were included to frustrate them whenever they supplied the correct answer.

The BBC Three comedy show Snuff Box had the two main characters Rich Fulcher and Matt Berry both appear on Mastermind. Berry chose his specialist subject as Alton Towers and only scored 3 points before a blackout, in which he apparently shoots the host after being told to sit down. Fulcher chooses 'Anglo-Saxon architecture', though displays no knowledge of the subject and makes up answers such as 'Toto from The Wizard Of Oz' and 'Elvis', and scoring no points.

In 2011, The Chris Moyles Show on BBC Radio 1 parodied the show with a feature called 'Disastermind'. Using the back-up chair from the Mastermind studio, each team member chose a specialist subject, only to have them swapped before being questioned in the chair on their randomly selected subject and general knowledge. The specialist subjects were The World of Glee; UK Dialling Codes; U2; Husky Dogs and Back to the Future.

In 2013, Mastermind featured on the ITV show Ant & Dec's Saturday Night Takeaway, as part of an Ant Vs Dec segment where Ant and Dec had to answer questions based around a school challenge they took part in. Ant won.

Transmissions

Regular

Supermind

Cup Final/Sport

International

Champions/Champion of Champions

Junior

Specials

International versions

Further reading
Raw, Mary-Elizabeth (1990) "--And no passes". Newmarket: R & W Publications  (by the 1989 winner)

References

BBC Genome project references

External links
 
 Junior Mastermind
 Sport Mastermind
 
 
 

1972 British television series debuts
1970s British television series
1980s British television series
1990s British television series
2000s British television series
2010s British television series
2020s British television series
BBC television game shows
1970s British game shows
1980s British game shows
1990s British game shows
2000s British game shows
2010s British game shows
2020s British game shows
English-language television shows
Television series by BBC Studios
Television series by Hat Trick Productions
Lost BBC episodes
Quiz shows